Peju Ogunmola is a Yoruba film actress who stars in Nollywood movies of Yoruba genres. Her father was the veteran actor Kola Ogunmola.

She is the wife of Sunday Omobolanle, a Nigerian comic actor, playwright, film director, and producer. She is the stepmother of Sunkanmi Omobolanle who is also an actor.

Early life 
Peju is from the Ekiti state town of Ado -Ekiti. Kola Ogunmola, her father, is an actor in Nigerian cinema. She was also Yomi Ogunmola's sister, a well-known Yoruba actor who died in 2003.

Career 
Peju has achieved success as a comedic performer, playwright, director, and producer. Maradona (2003), Mafi wonmi (2008), Toromade (2009), and Apaadi are some of her best-known works.

Peju Ogunmola and Tubosin Odunsin visited Osun State University as guests in July 2017. (UNIOSUN). The program ran from July 20 to July 22 and was called UNIOSUN Illumination. The program included theater, dancing music, talk programs, celebrity interviews, and empowerment seminars. Samson Braimah, Temitope Balogun, Prof. Kizito, Ore-Ofe Williams, Seun Fagbemi, Cymbals, Niyi Adebanjo, Sisdab, and other guests also attended the performance.

Personal life 
Peju is the second spouse of Sunday Omobolanle, also known as Papiluwe, a comedic performer and producer. A son named Sunkanmi was born into the union; he is an actor and a graduate of the Olabisi Onabanjo University in Ogun State in the field of business administration.

.

References

External links
Peju Ogunmola Biography

Yoruba actresses
Nigerian film actresses
Actresses in Yoruba cinema
Living people
Peju
Year of birth missing (living people)
21st-century Nigerian actresses
People from Ekiti State